Psittacodrillia is a genus of sea snails, marine gastropod mollusks in the family Horaiclavidae.

Species
Species within the genus Psittacodrillia include:
 Psittacodrillia albonodulosa (Smith E. A., 1904)
 Psittacodrillia bairstowi (Sowerby III, 1886)
 Psittacodrillia diversa (Smith E. A., 1882)

References

 R.N. Kilburn (1988), Turridae (Mollusca: Gastropoda) of southern Africa and Mozambique. Part 4. Subfamilies Drilliinae, Crassispirinae and Strictispirinae; Ann. Natal Mus. Vol. 29(1) Pages 167-320

External links
  Tucker, J.K. 2004 Catalog of recent and fossil turrids (Mollusca: Gastropoda). Zootaxa 682:1-1295.

 
Horaiclavidae
Gastropod genera